Ernst Hugo Heinrich Pfitzer (26 March 1846 – 3 December 1906) was a German botanist who specialised in the taxonomy of the Orchidaceae (orchids).

Biography 
Pfitzer was born in Königsberg. He studied chemistry and botany at Berlin and Königsberg, receiving his PhD in 1867. Afterwards he worked as assistant to Wilhelm Hofmeister in Heidelberg and under Johannes von Hanstein at the University of Bonn, where he obtained his habilitation in 1869. From 1872 to 1906 he was a professor and director of the botanical garden at Heidelberg.

In the first edition of Die Natürlichen Pflanzenfamilien, a work by Adolf Engler and Carl Prantl, he collaborated about orchids (published in 1889).

In addition to his work involving orchids, he conducted important research of diatoms, publishing the treatise "Untersuchungen über Bau und Entwicklung der Bacillariaceen (Diatomaceen)" (1871) as a result.

Selected works 
 Der Botanische Garten der Universität Heidelberg, 1880 – The botanical garden at the University of Heidelberg.
 Grundzüge einer vergleichenden morphologie der orchideen, 1882 – Principles on the comparative morphology of orchids.
 Entwurf einer Natürlichen Anordnung der Orchideen, 1887 – Outline on the natural arrangement of orchids.
 Orchidaceae-Pleonandrae, 1903 – Orchidaceae-Pleonandrae.
 Wilhelm Hofmeister, 1903 – biography of Wilhelm Hofmeister.
 Orchidaceae-Monandrae-Coelogyninae, 1907 (with Friedrich Wilhelm Ludwig Kraenzlin) – Orchidaceae-Monandrae-Coelogyninae.

He died in Heidelberg, aged 60.

References

External links
 
 

Orchidologists
1846 births
1906 deaths
Botanists with author abbreviations
Academic staff of Heidelberg University
Scientists from Königsberg
19th-century German botanists